General elections were held for the first time in Mauritius between 11 and 20 January 1886. They followed the introduction of a new constitution the previous year. The Democrats and Reformists (also known as the Oligarchs) each won five of the ten elected seats.

Electoral system
The new constitution provided for a 28-member Council of Government, which consisted of the Governor, 12 officials, 5 appointed members and 10 elected members. The ten elected members were returned from nine constituencies formed from the nine districts, which all districts returning one member except Port Louis, which returned two. Voting took place in each constituency on a different day, starting in Port Louis on 11 January and ending in Grand Port on 20 January.

The franchise for the elections was severely limited; the right to vote was restricted to male British subjects aged 21 and over and who possessed Rs300 of immovable property or movable property worth Rs3,000, a monthly salary of Rs50, those paying rent of Rs25 a month or paying a licence duty of at Rs200 a year. People married to eligible voters, or the oldest son of a qualifying widow were also entitled to vote. As a result, although the population of Mauritius was 359,688, only 4,061 people were eligible to vote, of which just 253 were Asian.

Campaign
A total of 25 candidates contested the elections; led by William Newton, the Reformists nominated ran candidates in all ten constituencies. The Democrats put forward nine, with their leader Onésipho Beaugeard running in two constituencies. The remaining six candidates were independents, one of whom (Arthur Pitot) also ran in two candidates.

Despite the limited franchise, election notices were published in English, French, Hindustani (written in Arabic script), Tamil and Chinese.

Results

By constituency

References

Mauritius
1886
1886 in Mauritius
January 1886 events